The Jonas Salisbury House is a historic house at 62 Walnut Park in Newton, Massachusetts.  The -story wood-frame house was built about 1847, and was one of four temple-front mansions built in the Newton Corner area.  Of these, it is the only one still standing.  It has typical hallmarks of the Greek Revival style, with flushboarded facade, corner pilasters, and an entrance flanked by pilasters and set under a pediment.  The property also includes a period carriage house.  Jonas Salisbury was a significant property owner in Newton.

The house was listed on the National Register of Historic Places in 1986.

See also
 Jonas Salisbury House (85 Langley Road), a house owned by Salisbury
 National Register of Historic Places listings in Newton, Massachusetts

References

Houses on the National Register of Historic Places in Newton, Massachusetts
Houses completed in 1847
1847 establishments in Massachusetts
Greek Revival architecture in Massachusetts